How to Buy a Friend is a 2020 South Korean television series starring Lee Shin-young, Shin Seung-ho, Kim So-hye, Oh Hee-joon, Min Do-hee, and Cho Yi-hyun. Based on the Daum webtoon Friendship Contract by Laad Kwon, it aired on KBS2 from April 6 to April 14, 2020.

Synopsis
Two teenagers began a contractual relationship: Heo Don-hyuk promises to protect Park Chan-hong from his bully if the latter helps him uncover the truth behind the suicide of his girlfriend.

Cast

Main
 Lee Shin-young as Park Chan-hong
Also known as Ninja among his schoolmates, he is an ordinary high school student and has a talent for writing. He has a crush on Uhm Se-yoon.
 Shin Seung-ho as Heo Don-hyuk
Also known as Iron Man, he is notoriously known for his fists and has fought 10 men at one shot. He got landed in juvenile detention and came to the school that Chan-hong, Se-yoon and Kyung-pyo attend.
 Kim So-hye as Uhm Se-yoon
The prettiest and most popular girl in school.
 Oh Hee-joon as Oh Kyung-pyo
Chan-hong's best friend.
 Min Do-hee as Choi Mi-ra
Se-yoon's best friend, she was also close to Seo-jung in arts class.
 Cho Yi-hyun as Shin Seo-jung
The senior who committed suicide at school, she was also an art student and was close to Se-yoon and Mi-ra when she was alive.

Supporting

Chan-hong's family
 Kim Won-hae as Park Choong-chae
 Baek Ji-won as Oh Jung-hee

Pyung-seop's people
 Jang Hye-jin as Jo Pyung-seop
 Kim Do-wan as Kwak Sang-pil

Jeil High people
 Kim In-kwon as Woo Tae-jung
 Kim So-ra as Choi Jung-won
 Lee Jung-hyun as Kim Dae-yong
 Yoo Se-hyung as Ahn Seong-do

Production
The first script reading took place in January 2020 at KBS Annex Broadcasting Station in Yeouido, Seoul, South Korea.

Original soundtrack

Part 1

Part 2

Part 3

Part 4

Part 5

Awards and nominations

Ratings
In this table,  represent the lowest ratings and  represent the highest ratings.

Notes

References

External links
  
 
 

Korean Broadcasting System television dramas
Korean-language television shows
2020 South Korean television series debuts
2020 South Korean television series endings
South Korean romantic comedy television series
South Korean melodrama television series
South Korean high school television series
South Korean teen dramas
Television shows based on South Korean webtoons
Television series by Mega Monster
Television series about teenagers